Jussi Tapola (born June 13, 1974) is a Finnish ice hockey coach. He was the head coach for Kunlun Red Star in Beijing, China of the KHL.

Career 
Tapola spent his playing days in Finnish lower leagues, mostly turning out for Ahmat Hyvinkää. From 2004 to 2009, he worked as a youth coach at HPK and was promoted to assistant of the club’s Liiga squad prior to the 2009-10 season. He then served as head coach of Finland’s junior-national teams until 2012.

He joined the coaching staff of Liiga side Tappara as an assistant ahead of the 2012-13 campaign and was handed head coaching duties in 2014. As a first-year head coach, he guided the team to the 2015 Liiga finals, where they lost. The following year, Tapola was named the Liiga Coach of the Year after claiming the title with Tappara. After his time in Tappara, Tapola headed to China's team Kunlun who plays in KHL.

Achievements 
 2016, 2017, 2022: Finnish national champion (as head coach)
 2023, CHL champion (as head coach)
 2016: Kalevi Numminen Trophy (Liiga Coach of the Year)

References

External links
Jussi Tapola's profile at Eliteprospects.com

1974 births
Living people
Finnish ice hockey coaches
People from Kerava
Sportspeople from Uusimaa